Lepidochrysops michaeli is a butterfly in the family Lycaenidae. It is found in north-western Zambia.

Adults feed from the flowers of the larval host plant. They have been recorded on wing in October.

The larvae feed on Ocimum species.

Etymology
The species is named for Michael W. Gardiner.

References

Butterflies described in 2003
Lepidochrysops
Endemic fauna of Zambia
Butterflies of Africa